Ellman is a surname. Notable people with the surname include:

John Ellman, agriculturalist of Glynde who developed the Southdown breed of sheep
Louise Ellman, British politician
Mark Ellman, see Maui Tacos
Michael Ellman Dutch economist

See also
Ellman's
Ellman's reagent, a chemical compound used to quantify the number or concentration of thiol groups in a sample
Elman (disambiguation)
Richard Ellmann